Odontocymbiola is a genus of sea snails, marine gastropod mollusks in the subfamily Cymbiinae  of the family Volutidae.

Description
The radula contain fang-like cusps.

Species
Species within the genus Odontocymbiola include:
 Odontocymbiola americana (Reeve, 1856)
 Odontocymbiola diannae T. Cossignani, Allary & P. G. Stimpson, 2021
 Odontocymbiola magellanica (Gmelin, 1791)
 Odontocymbiola pescalia Clench & Turner, 1964
 Odontocymbiola simulatrix Leal & Bouchet, 1989
Species brought into synonymy
 Odontocymbiola canigiai Vasquez & Caldini, 1992: synonym of Odontocymbiola magellanica (Gmelin, 1791) 
 Odontocymbiola rucciana Vazquez & Caldini, 1990: synonym of Odontocymbiola pescalia Clench & Turner, 1964
 Odontocymbiola subnodosa (Leach, 1814): synonym of Odontocymbiola magellanica (Gmelin, 1791)

References

 Bail, P & Poppe, G. T. 2001. A conchological iconography: a taxonomic introduction of the recent Volutidae. Hackenheim-Conchbook, 30 pp, 5 pl.

External links

Volutidae